Selwyn Wright (/ˈˈseˌlwɪnˈˈraɪt /) (29 October 1934 – 12 February 2015) was an English physicist, who held the Brook Crompton Chair of Engineering at the University of Huddersfield in the UK. He is best known for the development of what the media termed "The Silence Machine" which was covered in some press, in New Scientist, and on some broadcast news network in the US.

Scientific contributions
Responsible for publishing over one hundred archived scientific journal documents and awarded six technology patents, Selwyn Wright was primarily a wave theorist who provided solutions to problems related to power systems, produced in-depth research focusing on sound and vibration technology, and helped advance the development of noise cancellation systems. He most recently re-adapted his classical acoustic wave theories, framing them in a series of publications in terms of an electromagnetic theory coupled to a universal electromagnetic reference field.

References

External links
ISVR, Institute of Sound and Vibration Research University of Southampton, UK
NASA Langley Research Center Hampton, VA
ONERA French Aerospace Laboratory Paris, France
Aérospatiale Marseilles, France

English engineers
English physicists
Theoretical physicists
1934 births
2015 deaths